The Markfield Institute of Higher Education is an educational institution based in Leicestershire, in the United Kingdom. Specialising in Islamic subjects, the institute runs part-time and full-time courses, awarding BA and MA degrees validated by Newman University, and PhD degrees validated by the University of Gloucestershire. The institute is accredited by the British Accreditation Council, reviewed by the Quality Assurance Agency for Higher Education, and registered with the Higher Education Funding Council for England.

Currently, the fees are £4,500 a year for UK and EU students, and £7,500 a year for international students.

The institute was established in 2000 and inaugurated by the Prince of Wales. In 2015, the institute was shortlisted for The Muslim News Award for Excellence in Education.

History and ethos
The Markfield Institute was established in the 2000, and was inaugurated by Prince Charles. The institute aims at promoting understanding between Muslim communities in the West and the pluralistic societies they are a part of through the positive contributions of its graduates. The institute endeavours to “integrate the richness and high standards of traditional Islamic scholarship with the best of Western research techniques, academic rigour and critical inquiry.” Over the years, more than 750 students have graduated from the Institute.

Location

The Markfield Institute is located within the rural village of Markfield in the British Midlands and is easily accessible by car and public transport. The village is situated within both National Forest and Charnwood Forest. It lies very close to the M1 motorway roughly 8 miles north west of  Leicester, and 10 miles south east of Loughborough. The institute is roughly 100 miles from London.

Notable attractions near the Institute include the Thornton Reservoir and Bradgate Park.

Academic programmes
The institute currently offers the following accredited BA and MA degrees:
 BA Islamic studies 
 MA Islamic studies 
 MA Muslim chaplaincy 
 MA Islamic banking, finance and management 
 MEd Islamic education 
 MA Islam and sustainable development 
New PhD applications are currently not being taken.

Scholars

Past academic staff
Over the years, many scholars have served as part of the academic teaching staff at the Institute. They include:
 Ataullah Siddiqui (reader in religious pluralism and inter-faith relations)
 Fozia Bora (University of Leeds)
 Dilwar Hussain
 Abdullah Sahin (University of Warwick)
 Adil Salahi

Outside academics

The Markfield Institute regularly invites outside scholars to present their research in lectures that are open to the public. Various scholars have given lectures over the years. These include: 
 Mohammad Akram Nadwi (Al-Salam Institute)
 Andrew Neil

Two-year BAs for darul uloom graduates
With Accreditation of Prior Learning (APL), the Markfield Institute allows students with prior training in Islamic studies, such as graduates of darul ulooms, to start their undergraduate degrees from the second year, thus allowing such students to complete a BA in two years.

Facilities

The Markfield Institute Library

The institute houses one of the largest Islamic libraries in Europe, holding over 40,000 volumes of books and journals.

Students of the institute may also use libraries of the University of Leicester and De Montfort University for reference purposes.

On site accommodation
Self-catering accommodation is available on site. Separate buildings serve has accommodation blocks for male and female students.

The Markfield Mosque
The Markfield Mosque is located on the institute’s campus. Friday sermons are given by both students and scholars.

Past sermons have been given by notable scholars like Abdal Hakim Murad of the Cambridge Muslim College.

Sports facilities and gym
The campus also has sports facilities that may be used to play football, volleyball, badminton, pool and table tennis. A small gym is also available.

References

External links
The Markfield Institute website

 
2000 establishments in England
Educational institutions established in 2000
Islamic universities and colleges in the United Kingdom
Higher education colleges in England
Further education colleges in Leicestershire